Liptovský Mikuláš District (okres Liptovský Mikuláš) is a district in the eastern part of Žilina Region of central Slovakia. The district was established in the 19th century with its current name and exists within current borders since 1996.  Its main cultural and economic center is its seat Liptovský Mikuláš. Liptovský Mikuláš District main economic branches are industry and tourism. In the district is located Liptovská Mara dam, one of the largest water reservoirs in Slovakia.

Municipalities

References

External links 

Official site

 
Districts of Slovakia